A keepwell agreement is a contract that a parent company will keep a subsidiary solvent.

References

Business terms
Corporate subsidiaries